Venus was launched at Chittagong in 1809 as a country ship. She participated as a transport in two British invasions. Then in 1815  captured her. By 1818 or so she was back under British ownership. She may have traded with New South Wales and the Cape of Good Hope. She was last listed in 1833.

Career
Early in her career Venus participated as a transport vessel in two British invasions. In 1810 Venus supported the British Invasion of Île Bonaparte and Île de France.

The next year she was a transport for the invasion of Java (1811).

Capture
Peacock, under the command of Master Commandant Lewis Warrington, departed New York 23 January 1815 and rounded the Cape of Good Hope into the Indian Ocean. There she captured three prizes in the Straits of Sunda: Union, Venus, and Brio del Mar (or Breo de Mar, or Brio de Mais), on 13, 21, and 29 June.

Venus, Captain Boone, was sailing in ballast from Isle of France to Batavia. Still she had a few articles which the Americans found of great use: shoes, stockings, handkerchiefs, razors, and combs. She also had about $5000 in silver stowed away in barrels of pork.

Warrington burnt both Union and Brio del Mar. He put Unions crew on Venus, which he made a cartel to carry both crews to Batavia. After she left on 24 June, he captured Brio del Mar and when fortuitously he again encountered Venus, he put Brio del Mars crew on Venus too.

After Peacock captured Venus, she was sold to Arab owners.

British ownership again
Venus returned to British ownership and was registered at Calcutta in 1818 and 1822. Even so, the East-India register and directory for 1819 did not list her. She did appear in the 1824 Register with G.Dawson, master, and J.Scott & Co., owners. She had undergone rebuilding at Fort Gloster, Calcutta.  She did not appear in the 1827 Register but did in the 1828 and 1829 Registers. The 1829 Register showed her master as A.Hogue and her owners still J.Scott and Co.

The following data is from Lloyd's Register (LR) and the Register of Shipping. It shows Venus trading with New South Wales and the Cape of Good Hope.

Fate
Venus was last listed in 1833 with data unchanged from that in LR in 1830.

Notes

Citations

References
 
 
  
 
 

1809 ships
British ships built in India
Age of Sail merchant ships of England
Captured ships